BG's Food Cartel (sometimes BG Food Cartel) is a food cart pod near The Round in Beaverton, Oregon, United States. The pod opened as Beaverton's first in 2018. Business have included:

 Avenue Saint Charles
 Burger Stevens
 Cocina Mexico Lindo
 E-san Thai Cuisine
 Fry Bar
 Le Bistro Montage
 Oh My Crepe
 Smaaken

References

External links 

 
 

Restaurants in Beaverton, Oregon
Street food in the United States